"Spotlight" is the first single from New Orleans rock group Mutemath's second album Armistice. The song was first released on the soundtrack to the 2008 film adaptation of Twilight, and it was the second single to be released from the album. The song was released digitally on Spotlight EP on February 10, 2009. The EP was also released on limited edition vinyl on March 24, 2009.

Releases

Spotlight EP
 "Spotlight" (Twilight Mix) – 3:20
 "Clockwork" (EP version) – 4:44
 "Earlylight" (EP version) – 4:22
 "Spotlight" (Son Lux Remix) – 3:27

Promotion
The group performed "Spotlight" for the first time on The Tonight Show with Jay Leno on January 15, 2009, featuring guest appearances from Adam LaClave and Jonathan Allen from Club of the Sons and Jeremy Larson.

Music video
The music video for "Spotlight" consists of the band playing the song in a time lapse effect, in the back of a moving vehicle.

Charts
The EP debuted at number five on iTunes Top Rock chart, number 17 on iTunes top albums the week of February 10, 2009, landed at number 18 on Amazon Top Rock MP3 Albums and number 45 on Amazon top MP3 Albums.

Release history

References

2009 singles
2009 songs
Mutemath songs
Songs from The Twilight Saga (film series)
Songs written by Paul Meany
Songs written by Tedd T
Warner Records singles